Dirtdish is the sole studio album by English-based industrial act Wiseblood. It was released in 1986 by K.422/Some Bizzare. It was re-released on CD in 1995 by Thirsty Ear. The CD release of Dirtdish is Some Bizzare #WISE 3CD.

Fear Factory covered "O-O (Where Evil Dwells)" on their album Obsolete.

Critical reception
Trouser Press wrote that "if the album lacks a full load of explosive Foetus audio dynamite, it still packs enough ugliness and venom to corrupt a monastery." Spin wrote that the album "allows Foetus the space to fully unfurl the thick, viscous wordchains he uses for lyrics." Dave Thompson, in Alternative Rock, called the album "disappointing" and "not the full frontal assault one would hope to find." CMJ New Music Report wrote that "the songs all build on heavy, intense tribal percussion overlayed with bits of whiney distorted guitar."

Track listing
All songs by Clint Ruin & Roli Mosimann unless noted.
1. "Prime Gonzola" – 5:35
2. "0-0 (Where Evil Dwells)" – 5:20
3. "Stumbo" – 7:40
4. "Someone Drowned In My Pool" (Ruin) – 7:37
5. "Godbrain" – 6:57
6. "The Fudge Punch" – 6:34

Extended CD track list
7. "Motorslug" – 9:37
8. "Stumbo (12" Version)" – 6:34
9. "Death Rape 2000" – 7:29
10. "Someone Drowned In My Pool (12" Version)" – 7:42 Thirsty Ear CD only

"Motorslug" and "Death Rape 2000" comprised the "Motorslug" 12" single.
"Stumbo (12" Version)" and "Someone Drowned In My Pool (12" Version)" comprised the "Stumbo" 12" single. Both are remixes of the album tracks.
 "0-0 (Where Evil Dwells)" is about murderer Ricky Kasso

Personnel 
Wiseblood - performance, production
Clint Ruin - all instruments, lead vocals, sleeve design (as J. G. Thirlwell)
Roli Mosimann - all instruments
Robert Quine - guitar (1, 4)
Hahn Rowe - bass guitar (1), violin (4), recording, mixing
Phoebe Legere - piano (4)
Norman Westberg - guitar (6)
Technical
Craig Beaven - recording
Steve Peck - mixing
Warne Livesy - mixing
Jack Adams - mastering

References

External links 
 
 Dirtdish at foetus.org

1987 debut albums
JG Thirlwell albums
Some Bizzare Records albums
Thirsty Ear Recordings albums